Miss Universe Vietnam 2017 was the 3rd edition of the Miss Universe Vietnam pageant. It was held on January 6, 2018 at Crown Convention Center, Nha Trang. Miss Universe Vietnam 2015 Phạm Thị Hương crowned her successor H'Hen Niê at the end of the event. H'Hen Niê was appointed as Miss Universe Vietnam 2018 to represent Vietnam at Miss Universe 2018 in Bangkok, Thailand, finishing in the Top 5. Later, first runner-up Hoàng Thùy became Miss Universe Vietnam 2019 and represented the country at Miss Universe 2019 and finished in the Top 20.

The selection of Miss Universe Vietnam 2017 is accompanied by a reality television series called I Am Miss Universe Vietnam, in which contestants are put through different challenges and training programs in each weekly episode. Initially, the contest finale was scheduled to be held in August 2017. However, it was subsequently pushed back to December 2, 2017. The final was once again pushed back to January 6, 2018 amidst ongoing recovery efforts in Nha Trang - the host city - after Typhoon Damrey hit the region in early November.

Results

Placements
Color keys

Special Awards

Contestants

Top 45 final round

Top 70 preliminary

References

Beauty pageants in Vietnam
2017 beauty pageants
Vietnamese awards